Florida's 21st congressional district is a U.S. congressional district in the Treasure Coast. In the 2020 redistricting cycle, the district was drawn as a successor to the previous 18th district and contains all of St. Lucie County and Martin County as well as the northeastern part of Palm Beach County, and includes Port St. Lucie, Fort Pierce, Stuart, Jupiter, and Palm Beach Gardens, as well as Treasure Coast International Airport. The previous iteration of the 21st district, which extended from Delray Beach to Palm Beach, was instead renamed the 22nd district.

From 2003 to 2013, the 21st district was located in Miami-Dade County and included many of Miami's western suburbs, such as Hialeah, Olympia Heights and Cutler Bay. In December 2015, Florida underwent redistricting due to a Florida Supreme Court ruling. Much of the 21st district became the 22nd district and was pushed further into Broward County. In the process, it absorbed the part of Broward County that had previously been in the neighboring 22nd district, which had been renumbered the 21st. This came after the state supreme court urged the creation of one district covering most of Palm Beach County and another covering most of Broward County and a part of Palm Beach.

The district was represented by Democrat Lois Frankel from 2017 until 2023. After redistricting, the district has been represented by Republican Brian Mast since 2023.

List of members representing the district

Results in presidential elections

Election results

2002

2004

2006

2008

2010

2012 
Redistrict from 19th district

2016
Democrat Ted Deutch represented the district after being elected in 2012. As a result of 2015's statewide redistricting, Deutch effectively swapped seats with Lois Frankel, the 22nd District's current representative. In 2016, Deutch sought election to the 22nd District seat while Frankel sought election from District 21.

2020

|- class="vcard"
| style="background-color: white; width: 2px;" |
| class="org" colspan="2" | Write-in
| style="text-align:right;" | 12
| style="text-align:right;" | <0.1
|-

2022

References 

 The Miami Herald; 3 Fla Congressional Candidates in Spotlight by Lesley Clark; August 27, 2008, page A2

21